A fire trail is a rural road built specifically for the purpose of access for "fire management purposes" including building containment lines and backburning operations.

The term is part of the vocabulary of Australian bushfire control and may also sometimes be known as a fireroad in US terminology. A fire trail may act as part of a control line or fire break but a fire trail in itself does not constitute a fire break. In California, where "fire trail" is the preferred term, it frequently refers to the unpaved roads built for wildfire control on undeveloped urban hills and foothills rather than those in rural regions. Local residents in urban communities such as San Diego County, Los Angeles County, and the East Bay use them for hiking.

As fire trails provide access to otherwise remote areas, they suffer from adverse effects including: illegal activities, erosion, noise pollution, weed invasion, and stuck vehicles.

As the fire trails are unpaved, contour banks are essential to control erosion and track degradation.

References

External links
 "Access" NSW Rural Fire Service, Building in Bushfire Prone Areas

Bushfires in Australia
Fire suppression
Wildfire suppression